Robert Berry is an American guitarist, vocalist and producer.

Robert Berry may also refer to:
 Robert Marion Berry (born 1942), American politician
 Robert Berry (MP) (died 1618), Member of Parliament (MP) for Ludlow
 R. J. Berry (1934–2018), British geneticist
 Robert E. Berry, American food scientist
 Robert Edward Fraser Berry (1926–2011), Anglican bishop
 Robert Berry (runner) (1972–2014), marathon runner who died at the 2014 London Marathon
 Robert Griffith Berry (1869–1945), Welsh minister
 Robert Mallory Berry (1846–1929), American naval officer and Arctic explorer

See also
Bob Berry (disambiguation)
Robert Barry (disambiguation)